Takis Sakellariou (born 1908, date of death unknown) was a Greek writer. His work was part of the literature event in the art competition at the 1936 Summer Olympics.

References

1908 births
Year of death missing
20th-century Greek male writers
Olympic competitors in art competitions
Place of birth missing